The Jāmeh Mosque of Nishapur ( - Masjid-e-Jāmeh Neyshabur) is the grand congregational mosque (jāmeh mosque) of the city of Nishapur in Iran. This mosque was founded by Pahlavan Ali Karkhi in 1493 during the rule of Husayn Bayqarah of the Timurid dynasty. This mosque was also rebuilt during the reign of Abbas the Great, the Safavid Shah of Persia. This mosque is part of the National Heritage List of Iran.

Gallery

Sources 
 history

Religious buildings and structures completed in 1493
15th-century mosques
Mosques in Iran
1493 establishments in Asia
Buildings and structures in Nishapur
Buildings and structures in Razavi Khorasan Province
National works of Iran
Tourist attractions in Razavi Khorasan Province
Nishapur